InvaXön – Alieni nello spazio is an Italian television series.

See also
List of Italian television series

External links
 

Italian television series
2007 Italian television series debuts
2000s Italian television series